Der Blatt ("The Page" or "The Newspaper") is a weekly Yiddish newspaper published in New York City by Satmar Hasidim.

History
Der Blatt was established in 2000, as a direct result of the Satmar succession feud. Prior to that time, there was only one Satmar newspaper, Der Yid. In the dispute over the succession, Der Yid came under the control of the supporters of Rabbi Zalman Teitelbaum. This left the supporters of his rival, Rabbi Aaron Teitelbaum, without a platform for communication and public relations, prompting them to establish a newspaper of their own. The resulting publication, but promotes Rabbi Aaron, rather than Rabbi Zalman, as the legitimate successor of the previous rebbe. The publication adheres to a strict interpretation of tzniut that prohibits photographs of women on its pages. Der Blatt follows Satmar's anti-Zionist stance.

See also 
 Der Yid
 Kindline

External links 
 Yiddish Publications

Newspapers published in Brooklyn
Jewish newspapers published in the United States
Yiddish-language newspapers published in the United States
Weekly newspapers published in the United States
Satmar (Hasidic dynasty)
Newspapers established in 2000
Jews and Judaism in Brooklyn
Non-English-language newspapers published in New York (state)
Yiddish culture in New York City
2000 establishments in New York City
Williamsburg, Brooklyn